Makiyamaia decorata is an extinct species of sea snail, a marine gastropod mollusc in the family Clavatulidae.

Distribution 
Fossils of this species were found in Eocene deposits in the Lower Snatolskaya Formation, Russia (age range 48.6 to 37.2 Ma).

References

 A. E. Oleinik and L. Marincovich. 2003. Biotic response to the Eocene-Oligocene Transition: Gastropod assemblages in the High-Latitude North Pacific. From Greenhouse to Icehouse. The Marine Eocene-Oligocene transition. 36–56

External links

decorata
Gastropods described in 1991